The Howard Gilman Foundation is a charitable organization started by Howard Gilman.

Howard Gilman Memorial Park
Howard Gilman Opera House at the Brooklyn Academy of Music
White Oak Plantation in Jacksonville, Florida

References

External links
Foundation

Foundations based in the United States
Organizations established in 1981
1981 establishments in the United States